Aletris aurea  (golden unicorn root)  is a plant species native to the southeastern United States from eastern Texas and southeastern Oklahoma to Maryland.

Aletris aurea  is a perennial herb up to 80 cm tall, with a long spike of small, golden-yellow, bell-shaped flowers.

References

External links
Lady Bird Johnson Wildflower Center, University of Texas
Alabama Plants

Nartheciaceae
Endemic flora of the United States
Flora of the Southeastern United States
Plants described in 1788